The Philatelic Literature Society (1907–1918) was a short-lived society to promote the cause of philatelic literature among philatelists at a time when information about philately could be hard to obtain and philatelic books expensive.

Formation
The first meeting of the society was on 29 October 1907 at St.Bride's Institute in London and Edward Denny Bacon, later a President of the Royal Philatelic Society London, was appointed its first President. He remained in that post until 1914. The founding Vice-President was B.T.K. Smith, the Hon. Secretary and Treasurer was F.J. Peplow and the ordinary members were H. Clark, Johnny Johnson, Fred Melville and H.E. Weston.

Works
One of the most important works of the Society was a catalogue of the Crawford Library, written by Bacon, titled The Catalogue of the Philatelic Library of the Earl of Crawford, K.T., a work which won a Large Gold medal at the Postwertzeichen Ausstellung stamp exhibition in Vienna in 1911. A supplement to the catalogue was published in 1926 by the PLS and an addenda in the March 1938 edition of The London Philatelist, both by Bacon.

Journal
A journal was published, titled simply the Journal of the Philatelic Literature Society. Only one hundred copies of each issue were printed.

Demise
The society was disbanded in 1918 and, despite attempts to revive it, was dissolved in 1929.

References

Further reading
King-Farlow, Roland. Journal of the Philatelic Literature Society cumulative index. Volumes I-XI, 1908-1918. London: Royal Philatelic Society, 1948.

Philatelic organisations based in the United Kingdom
Philatelic literature